The Trivulzio Madonna is a painting by the Italian Renaissance painter Andrea Mantegna, executed in 1497. It is housed in the Sforza Castle Pinacoteca of the Castello Sforzesco, Milan.

The work portrays the Madonna enthroned surrounded by several saints. The theme of the cherubim surrounding the Madonna is a reference to Annunciation. On the side the saints are surmounted by two citrus trees, the two figures in the foreground are portrayed in order to be observed from a lower position. In the lower centre are three busts of chanting angels around an organ, an allusion the Olivetan church of Santa Maria in Organo at Verona, for which the panel was executed. The current name comes from the Trivulzio Collection of Milan, to which it belonged from 1791 to 1935.

References 
Page at artonline.it 

The Madonna by Filippo Lippi is the Trivulzio Madonna as stipulated to in the information signs attached to the paintings at the Pinacoteca del Castello Sforzesco <https://it.wikipedia.org/wiki/Madonna_Trivulzio>

The pictures of both:

<https://commons.wikimedia.org/wiki/File:Trivulzio_Madonna.jpg>

Paintings of the Madonna and Child by Andrea Mantegna
1497 paintings
Angels in art
Paintings in the Sforza Castle
Paintings of Benedict of Nursia
Paintings of Pope Gregory I